African Men's Handball Championship for Clubs Winner's Cup is an annual international club handball competition run by the African Handball Confederation. The cup winners from Africa's national handball leagues are invited to participate in this competition.

Summary 
{| class="wikitable" style="font-size:90%; width: 98%; text-align: center;"
|- bgcolor=#C1D8FF
!rowspan=2 width=5%|Year
!rowspan=2 width=8%|Host
!width=1% bgcolor=ffffff rowspan=40|
!colspan=3|Final
!width=1% bgcolor=ffffff rowspan=37|
!colspan=3|Third place match
|- bgcolor=#EFEFEF
!width=16%|Champion
!width=6%|Score
!width=16%|Second place
!width=16%|Third place
!width=6%|Score
!width=16%|Fourth place
|- 
|1985Details
|Cairo
| Zamalek S.C 
|Round-robin
| Al Ahly SC
|colspan=3| Niger United
|- bgcolor=#D0E7FF
|1986Details
|Cotonou
|Niger United 
| – 
| Port Said S.C
|Zamalek S.C 
| – 
| Nadit Alger
|- 
|1987Details
|Cairo
|MP Oran 
| – 
| Zamalek S.C
| Port Said S.C 
| – 
| Niger United
|- bgcolor=#D0E7FF
|1988Details
|Oran
|MC Alger 
| – 
| MC Oran
| Club Africain 
| – 
| SO Armée
|- 
|1989Details
|Cairo
|JSB ERCA Alger 
| 19 – 18 
| MC Alger
| Club Africain 
| 25 – 21 
| Al Ahly SC
|- bgcolor=#D0E7FF
|1990Details
|Rabat
|JSB ERCA Alger 
| – 
| MC Alger
| Zamalek S.C 
| 25 – 22 
| COD Meknès
|- 
|1991Details
|Algiers
|MC Alger 
| – 
| JSB ERCA Alger
| Port Said S.C 
| – 
| EM Mahdia
|- bgcolor=#D0E7FF
|1992Details
|Bauchi
|MC Alger 
| – 
| FAP Yaoundé
| Benue Buffaloes 
| – 
| Pelican Cotonou
|- 
|1993Details
|Cairo
|MC Alger 
| – 
| Port Said S.C
| Zamalek S.C 
| – 
| JSB ERCA Alger
|- bgcolor=#D0E7FF
|1994Details
|Rabat
|MC Alger 
| – 
| JSB ERCA Alger
| EM Mahdia 
| – 
| COS MUV
|- 
|1995Details
|Niamey
|MC Alger 
| – 
| FAP Yaoundé
| Primeiro de Agosto 
| – 
| AS SONIDEP
|- bgcolor=#D0E7FF
|1996Details
|Meknes
|KAC Marrakech 
| – 
| MC Alger
| COD Meknès 
| – 
| GD da Banca
|- 
|1997Details
|Kano
|MC Alger 
| – 
| Abuja Unity Boys
| Kano Pyramid 
| – 
| FAP Yaoundé
|- bgcolor=#D0E7FF
|1998Details
|Bauchi
| MC Alger 
| – 
| FAP Yaoundé
| Étoile du Congo 
| – 
| Customs Kings
|- 
|1999Details
|Algiers
|MC Alger 
| 25 – 23 
| OC Alger
| K.B.M Handball 
| 31 – 22 
| Minuh Yaoundé
|- bgcolor=#D0E7FF
|2000Details
|Bauchi
|FAP Yaoundé 
| – 
| Yankari Bulls
| Minuh Yaoundé 
| – 
| SO Armée
|- 
|2001Details
|Meknes
|Club Africain 
| – 
| Al Ahly SC
| OC Alger 
| – 
| COD Meknes
|- bgcolor=#D0E7FF
|2002Details
|Yamoussoukro
|Minuh Yaoundé 
| – 
| Pelican Cotonou
| SO Armée 
| – 
| Red Star Oja
|- 
|2003Details
|Tunis
|ES Tunis HC 
| – 
| AS Hammamet
| SR Annaba 
| – 
| Minuh Yaoundé
|- bgcolor=#D0E7FF
|2004Details
|Tunis
|Club Africain 
| – 
| ES Tunis HC
| Minuh Yaoundé 
| – 
| HC BCC Kinshasa
|- 
|2005Details
|Fes
|Club Africain 
| – 
| MAS Fez
| Red Star Oja 
| – 
| Diables Noires
|- bgcolor=#D0E7FF
|2006Details
|Abidjan
|Minuh Yaoundé 
| – 
| Red Star Oja
| SO Armée 
| – 
| Patronage Sainte-Anne
|- 
|2007Details
|Mahdia
|Club Africain 
| – 
| EM Mahdia
| Zamalek S.C 
| 41 – 39 (ET)
| Minuh Yaoundé
|- bgcolor=#D0E7FF
|2008Details
|Meknes
|Club Africain 
|33 – 31 (ET)
| MC Saïda
| JSE Skikda 
|39 – 32
| COD Meknès
|- 
|2009Details
|Cotonou
| Zamalek S.C 
|31 – 28
| Minuh Yaoundé
| Inter Club Brazzaville 
| – 
| Red Star Oja
|- bgcolor=#D0E7FF
|2010Details
|Ouagadougou
|Zamalek S.C 
|28 – 26
| Interclube
| Minuh Yaoundé 
|31 – 28
| JSE Skikda
|- 
|2011Details
|Yaoundé
|Zamalek S.C 
|27 – 21
| FAP Yaoundé
| Munisport 
|36 – 29
| Wydad Smara
|- bgcolor=#D0E7FF
|2012Details
|Tunis
|ES Sahel H.C 
|23 – 18
| Zamalek S.C
| Club Africain 
|33 – 23
| RS Berkane
|- 
|2013Details
|Hammamet
|Al Ahly SC 
|31 – 18
| AS Hammamet
| ES Sahel H.C 
|33 – 24
| Niger United
|- bgcolor=#D0E7FF
|2014Details
|Oyo
|ES Tunis HC
||26 – 24
| Al Ahly SC 
| Salinas HC
|Round robin
| Patronage Sainte-Anne
|- 
|2015Details
|Libreville
|ES Tunis HC 
|27 – 26
| Al Ahly SC
| Club Africain 
|33 – 25
| Stade Mandji
|- bgcolor=#D0E7FF
|2016Details
|Laayoune
|Zamalek S.C
|26 – 25
|ES Tunis HC
|AS Hammamet
|32 – 31
|Heliopolis S.C
|- 
|2017Details
|Agadir
|Al Ahly SC 
|31 – 22
| AS Hammamet
| Wydad Smara 
|26 – 20
| Raja d'Agadir
|- bgcolor=#D0E7FF 
|2018Details
|Cairo
|Al Ahly SC 
|25 – 12
| Al-Ittihad SC
| Wydad Smara 
|24 – 23
| JS Kinshasa
|-
|2019Details
|Oujda
|ES Sahel H.C
|28 – 24
|Al Ahly SC 
|ES Tunis HC
|36 – 26
|MC Oujda
|- bgcolor=#cfcfcf
|2020
|
|colspan=9|Cancelled due to the COVID-19 pandemic
|- bgcolor=#D0E7FF 
|2021Details
|Meknes
|Al Ahly SC 
|29 – 24
| Wydad Smara
!width=1% bgcolor=ffffff rowspan=2|
| Interclube
|29 – 28
| JS Kinshasa
|-
|2022Details
|Niamey
| Zamalek S.C 
|29 – 28
| Al Ahly SC 
| FAP Yaoundé
|29 – 28
| SC Don Bosco
|} A round-robin tournament determined the final standings.

Winners by club

Rq:GS Pétroliers (ex. MP Alger & MC Alger)OC Alger (ex. IRB Alger)MC Oran (ex. MP Oran)''

Winners by country

Participation details

See also
 African Women's Handball Cup Winners' Cup
 African Handball Champions League
 African Women's Handball Champions League
 African Handball Super Cup
 African Women's Handball Super Cup
 African Men's Handball Championship
 African Women's Handball Championship

External links
 African handball Cup Winners' Cup  - goalzz.com
 Men's & Women's Cup Winners' Cup history - cahbonline

 
African Handball Confederation competitions
African handball club competitions
1985 establishments in Egypt
Recurring sporting events established in 1985
Multi-national professional sports leagues